The ICC Intercontinental Shield 2009–2010, is the tier two of the ICC Intercontinental Cup, will be played between Bermuda, Namibia, Uganda and United Arab Emirates. The Shield started in August with the match Bermuda vs Uganda in Hamilton, Bermuda

Fixtures

Points table

Win – 14 points
Draw if more than 10 hours of play lost – 7 points (otherwise 3 points)
First Innings leader – 6 points (independent of result)
Abandoned without a ball played – 10 points.

Matches

2009 season

2009/10 season

2010 season

2010/11 season

Final

Stats

Runs

Wickets

References

ICC Intercontinental Cup
Intercontinental Shield